A supine is a verbal noun in some languages.

Supine may also refer to:

Supine (temperament), a temperament in the psychological model of five temperaments 
Supine position, the position of the body lying with the face up
Supination, a position of either the forearm or foot

See also
Anatomical terms of location